John Gerard Beattie MBE (9 November 1926 – 9 July 2020) was a Scottish actor and stand-up comedian whose career spanned over six decades. He appeared on shows including the sketch show Scotch & Wry and the sitcom Rab C. Nesbitt, and later appeared in more dramatic roles including Malcolm Hamilton in the soap opera River City.

Early life and career

Beattie was born in Govan, Glasgow on 9 November 1926 into a working class family. He grew up there with an older brother, Frank, and two younger sisters, Mary and Cathie. He attended St Gerard's Roman Catholic Secondary School, but left school at sixteen to start an apprenticeship and became involved with amateur dramatics, and by the mid-1950s he had become a stand-up comedian.
 
Beattie starred in his own sketch show, Johnny Beattie's Saturday Night Show, which featured him playing many different colourful characters, including his alter ego "Glaikit O'Toole". The show ran on BBC One from January 1964 to February 1970. In 1974, Beattie took part in STV's four-part series A Grand Tour, along with Rikki Fulton, Jack Milroy, Billy Connolly, Mark McManus and Stanley Baxter, in which the six performers went on a grand tour of Scotland and took part in useless tasks. Beattie recalled his most renowned moment on the show as when he was made to "Take a long drop off a short pier", in which each of the participants had to compete.

Beattie went on to appear on Rikki Fulton's sketch show Scotch & Wry, at one point appearing as his alter ego Glaikit O'Toole, who encounters Fulton's character Supercop in one of the sketches. While on the set of Scotch & Wry, he met actor Gregor Fisher, with whom he went on to appear in the 1990s sitcom Rab C. Nesbitt. In 1990, Beattie starred in The Big Man alongside Billy Connolly and Liam Neeson. He also appeared in popular Scottish television shows including Taggart, and he was also the original host of the Scottish Television gameshow Now You See It for three years between 1981-84.

He had a couple of local hit records with "Scotch on the Rocks" and "The Glasgow Rap". He was cast as Malcolm Hamilton in the Scottish soap opera River City, a role which he had retained since the show began in 2002. He filmed his last scenes for the show in April 2015 having announced his retirement after more than 60 years. He was the Honorary President of the Scottish Music Hall Society.

Personal life and death

Beattie married Kitty Lamont in 1950. They had two daughters (Maureen, an actress, and Louise, a solicitor and former actress) and two sons (Paul and Mark). Beattie and Lamont separated in 1982, and she died in 1994.

Beattie died on 9 July 2020 at the St. Margaret’s Hospice in Clydebank, aged 93.

Awards
Beattie was appointed a Member of the Order of the British Empire in the 2007 New Year Honours list. He received the 1981 Benno Schotz award as TV Personality of the Year. He received the Lord Provost's Performing Arts Award in 1993.

References

External links 
 
 

1926 births
2020 deaths
Scottish male television actors
Scottish game show hosts
Scottish male soap opera actors
Members of the Order of the British Empire
People from Govan
Scottish male comedians
Male actors from Glasgow
Comedians from Glasgow
20th-century Scottish male actors
21st-century Scottish male actors
20th-century Scottish comedians
21st-century Scottish comedians